Umar Rana (born 28 May 1975) is a  Pakistani stand-up comedian based in Singapore.

Biography 

Umar began his comedy career performing improv.  He was a founding member of Pakistan's first English-speaking improv troupe, Black Fish, which represented Pakistan in an international theatre festival in Manchester, England. He later moved to Bahrain because of a new job posting and, in January 2007, moved to Singapore.

After performing in many improv shows and stand-up comedy events, in September 2010 Umar founded Comedy Masala.  Comedy Masala offers a weekly open mic in Singapore and brings in comedians from across Asia.  Umar has also hosted many events, including Rob Schneider's stand-up comedy performance in Singapore.  Umar was also the second runner-up at the 2009 HK International Comedy Festival.

References

External links 
 Comedy Masala's website

Living people
1975 births
Pakistani stand-up comedians
Pakistani expatriates in Singapore
People from Karachi
Comedians from Karachi